This list of international newspapers originating in the United States  is a list of newspapers as described at newspaper types that are printed in the United States and distributed internationally.

In particular, this list considers a newspaper to be an international newspaper if the newspaper is printed in the United States and distributed in countries other than or in addition to the United States. International newspapers on this list may be repackaged national newspapers or "international editions" of national-scale or large metropolitan newspapers.

International newspapers 
 The Christian Science Monitor
 Epoch Times
 The Cambodian Journal
 International New York Times
 The Irish Echo
 The Union Signal
 The Wall Street Journal
 The Wall Street Journal Asia
 The Wall Street Journal Europe
The Asian Wire
 the East African

References

External links
Newspaper map worldwide
newspaperlinks.com
United States of America Press
US newspaper list
World Newspapers
Yahoo U.S. newspaper list
Newspapers - USA and worldwide

International